Rishi Sunak was invited by King Charles III to replace Liz Truss as Prime Minister of the United Kingdom on 25 October 2022, following Truss's resignation and the subsequent Conservative leadership election. The Sunak ministry is a Conservative majority government.

Cabinets

October 2022 – February 2023

Changes
Sir Gavin Williamson resigned as Minister of State without Portfolio on 8 November 2022.  This followed  allegations that he used improper language to former Chief Whip Wendy Morton and had bullied several staffers during his time as a Cabinet minister under Theresa May. 
 Nadhim Zahawi was dismissed as chairman of the Conservative Party after an investigation said he had committed a "serious breach of ministerial code" over his tax affairs. He was replaced by Greg Hands, who was a Trade Minister prior to this appointment.

February 2023 – present

List of ministers

Prime Minister and Cabinet Office

Departments of state

Law officers

Parliament

Departures from the Sunak ministry

List of departures from the Sunak ministry since 25 October 2022:

Non-ministerial appointments

Parliamentary Private Secretaries

Prime Minister's Office

Party Officers

Second Church Estates Commissioner

References

2022 establishments in the United Kingdom
Cabinets established in 2022
2020s in British politics
Current governments
British ministries
Ministries of Charles III
Ministry
History of the Conservative Party (UK)